Ersin Güreler (born September 7, 1978 in İstanbul, Turkey), is a Turkish retired footballer. He played as a left back position. Ersin was very attack-minded for a full-back.

He is a traveller of Turkish Football who already has worn jersey of 12 different teams during his career.

In the aftermath of the attempted coup d'etat of July 2016 he was accused of being involved in the Gülen movement. In January 2020 Güreler was sentenced to 6 years and 3 months imprisonment for being a member of an armed terror organization due to his links to the Gülen movement.

References

External links
 Profile at TFF.org 
 Profile at futbolig.com.tr 

1978 births
Living people
Turkish footballers
Zeytinburnuspor footballers
Eskişehirspor footballers
İstanbulspor footballers
Diyarbakırspor footballers
Akçaabat Sebatspor footballers
Kocaelispor footballers
Konyaspor footballers
Çaykur Rizespor footballers
Tepecikspor footballers
Association football fullbacks
Turkish prisoners and detainees